Space Launch Complex 1 (SLC-1) was a launch pad at Vandenberg Space Force Base in California, United States.
SLC-1 consisted of two pads, SLC-1E and SLC-1W. Both sites were built in 1958 for the never activated 75th Strategic Missile Squadron for Thor Agena A launches. SLC-1E launch pad 75-3-5, SLC-1W launch pad 75-3-4. Both were upgraded to a Space Launch Complex (SLC) in 1966. Deactivated with phaseout of Thor-Agena. SLC-1E deactivated 1968, 45 launches; SLC-1W deactivated in 1971, 56 launches.

References 
 
 

Vandenberg Space Force Base